Noel Hazzard was an Australian rugby league footballer who played in the 1940s and 1950s. An Australian international and Queensland interstate representative three-quarter back, he played his club football in  Bundaberg and Roma.

Hazzard captained a 'Natives' team in Queensland during the 1940s, suffering a broken collarbone in 1948.
In 1951 Hazzard was first selected to represent Australia, becoming Kangaroo number 284.
Hazzard was selected to go on the 1952-53 Kangaroo tour. He played in 23 games, including an appearance at centre for Australia in the first test at Leeds.

Hazzard was selected to play for Australia from Roma Wattles against Great Britain in 1957.

In 2008, rugby league in Australia's centenary year, Hazzard was named at centre in the Bundaberg Rugby League's team of the century.

References

External links
Noel Hazzard - Career Stats & Summary at rugbyleagueproject.org

Australian rugby league players
Queensland rugby league team players
Australia national rugby league team players
Rugby league centres